Nicolás Benedetti Roa (born 25 April 1997) is a Colombian professional footballer who plays as an attacking midfielder for Liga MX club Mazatlán.

Club career

Deportivo Cali 
Nicolás Benedetti made his debut with Deportivo Cali on 15 July 2015 on the 80th minute of the game against Boyacá Chico.

Club América 
On 30 January 2019, Benedetti joined Mexican side Club América.

International career
Benedetti was named in Colombia's provisional squad for Copa América Centenario but was cut from the final squad.

Honours

Club
América
Copa MX: Clausura 2019

References

External links 
 
 
 Profile Deportivo Cali
 

1997 births
Living people
Colombian footballers
Colombian expatriate footballers
Colombian people of Italian descent
Categoría Primera A players
Liga MX players
Deportivo Cali footballers
Club América footballers
Mazatlán F.C. footballers
Expatriate footballers in Mexico
Footballers from Cali
Colombia international footballers
Association football midfielders